Zaragoza is a municipality in the La Libertad department of El Salvador. 
  
Zaragoza is a small city between the cities of La Libertad and Santa Tecla. It is the third largest city in the department of La Libertad. The city has developed an important growth during the last 20 years, due to the suburban expansion of San Salvador.

Media 
Zaragoza has a radio denominated "Radio Bálsamo" in the frequency 92.1.

Places to visit

Church "Nuestra señora del pilar" 
Zaragoza has a beautiful church located in the center of the town, the church has already a large existence, but it is not known what date it appeared, since the "founders" of Zaragoza died, and few people still know of that. Ts still a book called "los relatos de mi abuela" where it talks about the stories of characters and places and even some traditions about the town.

Central Plaza 
Here we can find two soccer fields, two basketball courts and a skating rink, as well as a multipurpose room, a free virtual library and a modern municipal palace.

Waterparks 
One of the attractions of Zaragoza is the "Montaña acuática"where you can taste many dishes that are popular in the area. This is 2 kilometers from Zaragoza on the road to the port of La Libertad

Municipalities of the La Libertad Department (El Salvador)